"Waiting on You" is a song recorded by Canadian country music artist Charlie Major. It was released in 1996 as the fourth single from his second studio album, Lucky Man. It peaked at number 2 on the RPM Country Tracks chart in October 1996.

Chart performance

Year-end charts

References

1995 songs
1996 singles
Charlie Major songs
Arista Nashville singles
Songs written by Charlie Major